John Alkham (1354 – c. 1433) was the member of Parliament for the constituency of Dover for the parliament of 1407.

References 

Members of the Parliament of England for Dover
1354 births
1430s deaths
Year of death uncertain
English MPs 1407